Miranda Dam is a concrete buttress dam on the Douro, where the river forms the national border line between Spain and Portugal. It is located in the municipality Miranda do Douro, in Bragança District, Portugal.

Construction of the dam began in 1955. The dam was completed in 1961. It is owned by Companhia Portuguesa de Produção de Electricidade (CPPE).

Dam
Miranda Dam is an 80-m-tall (height above foundation) and 263-m-long buttress dam with a crest altitude of 535 m. The volume of the dam is 240,000 m³. The dam contains 4 crest spillways (maximum discharge 11,000 m³/s) and one bottom outlet.

Reservoir
At full reservoir level of 528.05 m (maximum flood level of 533 m) the reservoir of the dam has a surface area of 1.22 km² and its total capacity is 28.1 mio. m³ (active capacity 6.66 mio. m³).

Power plant 
The power plant went operational in 1960. It is a run-of-the-river hydroelectric power station. It is owned by CPPE, but operated by EDP. The plant has a nameplate capacity of 369 (390) MW. Its average annual generation is 897.8 (879 or 1,036.3) GWh.

Miranda I
The power station contains 3 Francis turbine-generators with 58.84 (67) MW each in an underground powerhouse. The turbine rotation is 150 rpm. The minimum hydraulic head is 51 m, the maximum 66 m. Maximum flow per turbine is 128 m³/s.

Miranda II
In 1995 an additional underground powerhouse was completed and a further Francis turbine with a 193 MW capacity went online. The turbine rotation is 100 rpm. The minimum hydraulic head is 40 m, the maximum 60 m. Maximum flow of the turbine is 386 m³/s.

See also

 List of power stations in Portugal

References

Dams in Portugal
Hydroelectric power stations in Portugal
Buttress dams
Dams completed in 1961
Energy infrastructure completed in 1961
1961 establishments in Portugal
Buildings and structures in Bragança District
Underground power stations
Dams on the Douro River